Diadinoxanthin is a pigment found in phytoplankton. It has the formula C40H54O3. It gives rise to the xanthophylls diatoxanthin and dinoxanthin.

Diadinoxanthin is a plastid pigment. Plastid pigments include chlorophylls a and c, fucoxanthin, heteroxanthin, diatoxanthin, and diadinoxanthin.

Diadinoxanthin is a carotenoid. It is found in diatoms, along with other carotenoids like fucoxanthin and beta-carotene. Diatoms are referred to as golden-brown microalgae because of the color of their plastids and because the carotenoids mask chlorophyll-a and chlorophyll-c.

Diadinoxanthin is a xanthophyll. Xanthophyll pigments are photoprotective pigments that help protect cells from harmful effects of too much light energy (light saturation). It is present in cells along with diatoxanthin (another xanthophyll). Diadinoxanthin is stockpiled in the cell to become available when needed. Thus it’s the inactive precursor of diatoxanthin, which is the active energy dissipator.

See also 
 Accessory pigment
 Algae
 Carotenoid
 Diatom
 Diatoxanthin
 Dinoxanthin
 Photoprotection
 Phytoplankton
 Xanthophyll

References 

Carotenoids
Alkyne derivatives
Epoxides
Cyclohexenes
Marine biology